Eric of Pomerania (1381 or 1382 – 24 September 1459) was the ruler of the Kalmar Union from 1396 until 1439, succeeding his grandaunt, Queen Margaret I. He is known as Eric III as King of Norway (1389–1442), Eric VII as King of Denmark (1396–1439) and has been called Eric XIII as King of Sweden (1396–1434, 1436–39). Later, in all three countries he became more commonly known as Erik av Pommern (Eric of Pomerania), a pejorative intended to point out that he belonged elsewhere. Eric was ultimately deposed from all three kingdoms of the union, but in 1449 he inherited one of the partitions of the Duchy of Pomerania and ruled it as duke until his death in 1459.

Succession background
Eric was born in either 1381 or 1382 in Darłowo, Pomerania (Poland). Born Bogusław, Eric was the son of Wartislaw VII, Duke of Pomerania, and Maria of Mecklenburg-Schwerin.

Margaret I, who ruled the kingdoms of Denmark, Norway, and Sweden, wanted her realm to be unified and peaceful and made provisions in the event of her death. She chose as her heir and successor Bogusław, the grandson of her sister Ingeborg (c. 1365 – c. 1402).

In 1389, Bogusław was brought to Denmark to be raised by Queen Margaret. His name was changed to the more Nordic-sounding Erik. On 8 September 1389, he was hailed as King of Norway at the Ting in Trondheim. He may have been crowned King of Norway in Oslo in 1392, but this is disputed.

Eric's father Wartislaw died between November 1394 and 23 February 1395. When Wartislaw died, his thrones were all attained by Eric as the heir.

In 1396, he was proclaimed as king in Denmark and then in Sweden. On 17 June 1397, he was crowned king of the three Nordic countries in the cathedral of Kalmar. At the same time, a union treaty was drafted, declaring the establishment of what has become known as the Kalmar Union (Kalmarunionen). Queen Margaret, however, remained the de facto ruler of the three kingdoms until her death in 1412.

Marriage

In 1402, Queen Margaret entered into negotiations with King Henry IV of England about the possibility of an alliance between the Kingdom of England and the Nordic union. The proposal was for a double wedding, whereby, King Eric would marry King Henry's second daughter, Philippa of England, and King Henry's son, the Prince of Wales and the future King Henry V, would marry King Eric's sister, Catherine of Pomerania (c. 1390–1426).

The double wedding did not come off, but King Eric's wedding to Philippa of England was successfully negotiated. On 26 October 1406, he married the 12-year-old Philippa in Lund. The wedding was accompanied by a purely defensive alliance with England. After Philippa's death later in 1430, King Eric replaced her with her former lady-in-waiting, Cecilia, who became his royal mistress and later his morganatic spouse. The relationship was a public scandal and is mentioned in the royal council's official complaints about the King.

Reign

During the early period of his reign, King Eric made Copenhagen a royal possession in 1417, thereby assuring its status as the capital of Denmark. He also usurped the rights of Copenhagen Castle from the Bishop of Roskilde, and from then on, the castle was occupied by him.

From contemporary sources, King Eric appears as intelligent, visionary, energetic, and a firm character. That he was also a charming and well-spoken man of the world was shown by his great European tour of the 1420s. Negatively, he seems to have had a hot temper, a lack of diplomatic sense, and an obstinacy that bordered on mulishness. King Eric was described by the future Pope Pius II as having "a beautiful body, reddish yellow hair, a ruddy face, and a long narrow neck … alone, without assistance, and without touching the stirrups, he jumped upon a horse, and all women were drawn to him, especially the Empress, in a feeling of longing for love".

From 1423 until May 1425, King Eric went on a pilgrimage to Jerusalem. After arriving there, he was dubbed Knight of the Holy Sepulchre by the Franciscan Custos of the Holy Land, and subsequently himself dubbed his pilgrim fellows, among them, Ivan Anz Frankopan. During his absence, Queen Philippa served as regent of the three kingdoms from Copenhagen.

Almost the whole of King Eric's sole rule was affected by his long-standing conflict with the Counts of Schauenburg and Holstein. He tried to regain South Jutland (Schleswig) which Queen Margaret had been winning, but he chose a policy of warfare instead of negotiations. The result was a devastating war that not only ended without conquests, but also led to the loss of the South Jutlandic areas that he had already obtained. During this war, he showed much energy and steadiness, but also a remarkable lack of adroitness. In 1424, a verdict of the Holy Roman Empire by Sigismund, King of Germany, recognising Eric as the legal ruler of South Jutland, was ignored by the Holsteiners. The long war was a strain on the Danish economy as well as on the unity of the north.

Perhaps King Eric's most far-ranging act was the introduction of the Sound Dues (Øresundtolden) in 1429, which was to last until 1857. It consisted of the payment of sound dues by all ships wishing to enter or leave the Baltic Sea passing through the Sound. To help enforce his demands, King Eric built Krogen, a powerful fortress at the narrowest point in the Sound, in the early 1400s. This resulted in the control of all navigation through the Sound, and thus secured a large stable income for his kingdom that made it relatively rich, and which made the town of Elsinore flower. It showed his interest in Danish trade and naval power, but also permanently challenged the other Baltic powers, especially the Hanseatic cities against which he also fought. From 1426 to 1435, he was at war with the German Hanseatic League and Holstein. When the Hanseats and Holsteiners attacked Copenhagen in 1428, and King Eric was absent from the city at Sorø Abbey and did not return so his wife Queen Philippa managed the defense of the capital.

During the 1430s, the policy of the King fell apart. In 1434, the farmers and mine workers of Sweden began a national and social rebellion which was soon used by the Swedish nobility in order to weaken the power of the King.  The Engelbrekt rebellion (1434–1436) was led by Swedish nobleman Engelbrekt Engelbrektsson (c. 1390 – 4 May 1436). The Swedes had been affected by the war with the Hanseatic League (1426–35) which affected trade and disturbed Swedish exports with Schleswig, Holstein, Mecklenburg, and Pomerania. The rebellion caused erosion within the unity of the Kalmar Union, leading to the temporary expulsion of Danish forces from Sweden. In Norway, a subsequent rebellion in 1436 was led by Amund Sigurdsson Bolt (1400–1465). It resulted in a siege of Oslo and Akershus Castle but ended in a ceasefire.

King Eric had to yield to the demands of both the Holsteiners and the Hanseatic League. In April 1435, he signed the peace of Vordingborg with the Hanseatic League and Holstein. Under the terms of the peace agreement, Hanseatic cities were excepted from the Sound Dues and the Duchy of Schleswig was ceded to the count of Holstein.

Coup d'état
When the Danish nobility subsequently opposed his rule and refused to ratify his choice of Bogislaw IX, Duke of Pomerania as the next King of Denmark, King Eric left Denmark in response and took up permanent residence at Visborg Castle in Gotland, which led to his deposition through coup d'état by the National Councils of Denmark and Sweden in 1439.

In 1440, King Eric was succeeded by his nephew Christopher of Bavaria, who was chosen for the thrones of both Denmark and Sweden. Initially the Norwegian Riksråd remained loyal to him and wanted him to remain king of Norway. In September 1439, Eric had given Sigurd Jonsson the title of drottsete, under which he was to rule Norway in the King's name. But with the King isolated in Gotland, the Norwegian nobility also felt compelled to depose Eric through a coup d'état in 1440, and he was formally deposed in 1442, when Sigurd Jonsson stepped down as drottsete, and Christopher was elected king.

At the death of King Christopher in 1448, the next monarch was Eric's kinsman, Christian of Oldenburg (the son of Eric's earlier rival, Count Theodoric of Oldenburg), who succeeded to the throne of Denmark, while Karl Knutsson Bonde succeeded to the throne of Sweden. A rivalry ensued between Charles and Christian for the throne of Norway. In 1450, Karl was forced to relinquish the throne of Norway in favour of King Christian.

Duke of Pomerania
For ten years, Eric lived in Gotland where he fought against the merchant trade in the Baltic. 
From 1449 to 1459, Eric succeeded Bogislaw IX as Duke of Pomerania and ruled Pomerania-Rügenwalde, a small partition of the Duchy of Pomerania-Stolp (Polish: Księstwo Słupskie), as "Eric I". He died in 1459 at Darłowo Castle
(German: Schloss Rügenwalde), and was buried in the Church of St. Mary's at Darłowo in Pomerania.

Titles and styles
Eric's full title was: "King of Denmark, Sweden and Norway, the Wends and the Goths, Duke of Pomerania".

Family tree

Notes

References

Other sources
Albrectsen, Esben (1997) Fællesskabet bliver til : 1380–1536 (Oslo : Universitetsforl.) 
Christensen, Aksel E. (1908) Kalmarunionen og nordisk politik 1319–1439 (Oslo: Gyldendal)    
Haug, Eldbjørg (2000), Margrete – den siste dronning i Sverreætten (Oslo: Cappelen) 
Haug, Eldbjørg (2006) Provincia Nidrosiensis i dronning Margretes unions- og maktpolitikk (Trondheim : Institutt for historie og klassiske fag) 
Larsson, Lars-Olof (2003) Kalmarunionens tid (Stockholm: Prisma)

External links 

His listing in "Medieval lands" by Charles Cawley. The project "involves extracting and analysing detailed information from primary sources, including contemporary chronicles, cartularies, necrologies and testaments."
 The King Who Became a Pirate, Story by Anja Klemp Vilgaard  ·  Illustrations by Darya Malikova  ·  Edited by Shawna Kenney   ·  20 April 2020, narratively.com

|-

|-

|-

|-

|-

1380s births
Year of birth uncertain
1459 deaths
14th-century Swedish monarchs
15th-century Swedish monarchs
14th-century Norwegian monarchs
15th-century Norwegian monarchs
People from Darłowo
Rulers of Finland
Dukes of Pomerania
Kalmar Union
Monarchs who abdicated
Medieval child monarchs
Swedish monarchs of German descent
Knights of the Garter
14th-century monarchs of Denmark
15th-century monarchs of Denmark
14th-century Polish people
House of Griffins
Medieval Knights of the Holy Sepulchre
Polish pirates
People from Gotland
Danish people of Polish descent